Alnyash is a rural locality (a selo) and the administrative center of Alnyashinskoye Rural Settlement, Chaykovsky, Perm Krai, Russia. The population was 805 as of 2010. There are 6 streets.

Geography 
Alnyash is located 47 km east of Chaykovsky. Kirillovka is the nearest rural locality.

References 

Rural localities in Chaykovsky urban okrug